This is a list of Nepali literature translated in the English language.

Nepali literature written in English

Further reading

References

English
Nepali literature
Literature,English